This is a list of notable beaches in the United Kingdom.

England

 Bigbury-on-Sea, Devon
 Biggar, Cumbria
 Blackpool, Lancashire
 Blackpool Sands, Devon
 Bournemouth, Dorset
 Brean, Somerset
 Bridlington, East Riding of Yorkshire
 Brighton, Sussex
 Bude, Cornwall
 Burnham-on-Sea, Somerset
 Castle Cove, Dorset
 Chesil Beach, Dorset
 Church Ope Cove, Dorset
 Clacton-on-Sea, Essex
 Crantock, Cornwall
 Dawlish Warren, Devon
 Earnse Bay, Cumbria
 Exmouth, Devon
 Fistral Beach, Cornwall
 Goodrington Sands, Devon
 Great Yarmouth, Norfolk
 Gyllyngvase, Cornwall
 Holywell Bay, Cornwall
 Lowestoft, Suffolk
 Lulworth Cove, Dorset
 Lyme Regis, Dorset
 Maenporth, Cornwall
 Margate, Kent
 Minehead, Somerset
 Morecambe Bay, Lancashire
 Mount's Bay, Cornwall
 Newquay, Cornwall
 Paignton, Devon
 Perranporth, Cornwall
 Porthcurno, Cornwall 
 Saunton Sands, Devon
 Scarborough, North Yorkshire
 Slapton Sands, Devon
 Southend-on-Sea, Essex
 St Oswald's Bay, Dorset
 Studland, Dorset
 Rampside Beach, Cumbria
 Roanhead, Cumbria
 St. Ives, Cornwall
 Teignmouth, Devon
 Torquay, Devon
 Watergate Bay, Cornwall
 Weston-super-Mare, North Somerset
 Westward Ho!, Devon
 Weymouth, Dorset
 Woolacombe, Devon

Northern Ireland

 Downhill Strand
 Magilligan
 Portstewart Strand
 White Park Bay

Scotland

 Aberdeen Beach
 Sandwood Bay

Wales

 Aberystwyth
 Barafundle Bay, South Pembrokeshire
 Broad Haven South, South Pembrokeshire
 Freshwater West, South Pembrokeshire
 Pendine Sands, Carmarthenshire
 Poppit Sands, Pembrokeshire
 Saundersfoot, South Pembrokeshire
 Tenby, South Pembrokeshire
 Whitesands, Pembrokeshire

British Overseas Territories

Akrotiri and Dhekelia

Anguilla

 Dog Island
 Island Harbour
 Scrub Island

Bermuda 

 Annie's Bay
 Castle Harbour
 Church Bay
 Coney Island
 Devil's Hole
 Gunner Bay
 Horseshoe Bay
 Ireland Island
 Tobacco Bay
 Turtle Bay

British Indian Ocean Territory

 Danger Island
 East Point
 Egmont Islands
 Nelsons Island
 Peros Banhos
 Salomon Islands
 Three Brothers

British Virgin Islands

 Beef Island
 Guana Island
 Scrub Island
 The Baths, Virgin Gorda
 Trunk Bay

Cayman Islands

Bodden Town
East End
North Side
West Bay

Falkland Islands

 Beauchene Island
 Beaver Island
 Blanco Bay
 Bull Point
 Carcass Island
 Concordia Bay
 Dunnose Head
 Foul Bay
 Fox Bay
 George Island
 Grand Jason Island
 Green Patch
 Johnson's Harbour
 Kepple Island
 Lively Island
 Pebble Island
 Saunders Island
 Speedwell Island
 Steeple Jason Island
 Weddell Island
 Westpoint Island
 Yorke Bay

Gibraltar

 Catalan Bay
 Eastern Beach
 Sandy Bay

Montserrat

 Little Bay
 Plymouth

Pitcairn Islands

 Bounty Bay
 Henderson Island
 Oeno Island

Saint Helena, Ascension and Tristan da Cunha

 Edinburgh of the Seven Seas
 Georgetown

South Georgia and the South Sandwich Islands

 Antarctic Bay
 Bay of Isles
 Cheapman Bay
 Church Bay
 Cooper Island
 Cumberland East Bay
 Cumberland West Bay
 Fortuna Bay
 Godthul
 Hound Bay
 Ice Fjord
 Iris Bay
 King Haakon Bay
 Newark Bay
 Ocean Harbour
 Queen Maud Bay
 Right Whale Bay
 Rocky Bay
 Royal Bay
 St Andrew's Bay
 Stromness
 Undine South Harbour
 Willis Islands
 Wilson Harbour

Turks and Caicos Islands

 Ambergris Cay
 East Caicos
 Parrot Cay
 Pine Cay
 Salt Cay

See also

 List of beaches (worldwide)
List of seaside resorts in the United Kingdom

References

External links
UK Beach List

 
United Kingdom geography-related lists

Atlantic Ocean-related lists
Beaches of the Caribbean